Cyperus pseudovegetus is a species of sedge that is found in southeastern parts of the United States of America, from Texas in the west, eastwards to the Atlantic Ocean.

The species was first formally described by the botanist Ernst Gottlieb von Steudel in 1854.

See also
 List of Cyperus species

References

pseudovegetus
Plants described in 1854
Taxa named by Ernst Gottlieb von Steudel
Flora of Texas
Flora of Alabama
Flora of Arkansas
Flora of Florida
Flora of Delaware
Flora of Georgia (U.S. state)
Flora of Indiana
Flora of Kansas
Flora of Kentucky
Flora of Louisiana
Flora without expected TNC conservation status